The International League Against Racism and Anti-Semitism—or Ligue internationale contre le racisme et l'antisémitisme (LICRA) in French—was established in 1927, and is opposed to intolerance, xenophobia and exclusion.

In 1927, French journalist Bernard Lecache created "The League Against Pogroms", and launched a media campaign in support of Sholom Schwartzbard who assassinated Symon Petliura on 25 May 1926 in the Latin Quarter of Paris. Schwartzbard viewed Petliura as responsible for numerous pogroms in Ukraine. After Schwartzbard's acquittal, the league evolved into LICA (Ligue internationale contre l'antisémitisme or International League Against Anti-Semitism). Schwartzbard was a prominent activist in this organization.

In 1931, LICA already counted 10,000 subscribers all over France. It was a solid power during the battle between leagues in February 1934.
After 1932, LICA evolved into LICRA, but the name was officially changed only in 1979 during the long  presidency of Jean Pierre-Bloch (from 1968 to 1992 in office).

In September 1939, as the Second World War started, numerous LICRA subscribers mobilised, and many were members of the Resistance throughout the war. During the German occupation of France, LICRA was banned by the Vichy government and had to regroup clandestinely to help the victims of Nazi racial measures, notably by hiding them away from Paris, by providing them with fake IDs, and by helping them escape to Switzerland, Spain and England.

In 1972, a law authorized LICRA to counsel victims of racist acts during their court appearances. Later, LICRA received considerable media attention during the case of LICRA v. Yahoo!, in which it brought charges against Yahoo! for selling Nazi memorabilia to people in France in violation of French laws proposed, passed, and used by and for LICRA.

The LICRA battles neonazism and Holocaust denial. This was demonstrated when it supported the Klarsfeld couple (Serge and Beate Klarsfeld), and during Klaus Barbie's trial in 1987.

In the last few years, LICRA intensified its international actions by opening sections abroad, in Switzerland, in Belgium, in Luxembourg, in Germany, in Portugal, in Quebec and more recently in Congo Brazzaville and in Austria.

Since 1999, with the arrival of president Patrick Gaubert, LICRA has extended its area of action. It now addresses social issues such as work discrimination, citizenship, and disadvantaged youth.

Since 2010 the new president is Alain Jakubowicz.

Commissions
 The Psychological Help Commission supports victims of racist or antisemitic acts who find themselves overwhelmed.
 The Juridical Commission examines and decides whether or not to sue racist speech or writing. It can also help victims by giving them juridic advice.
 The Youth Commission was created after the 2002 events, in order to fulfill its lack of young subscribers. It carries out local and national actions to make young people more sensitive to racism and antisemitism issues. This commission brings together subscribers aged 16 to 30, every second Sunday of the month.
 The Memory, History and Humans Rights Commission, created in 1986, informs and trains all the LICRA members. Its prevention actions are:
 historical information of the members,
 expertise regarding racism or antisemitism related books, photos and videos,
 spread of historical knowledge to teachers and students.
 The Sport Commission tries to maintain sport as an integration tool. It leads prevention action towards violence in stadiums. It fights against communitarism, and against those who use sport as a means of recruitment and infiltration. In Europe, the LICRA represents France in the FARE network.
 The Education Commission, led by Barbara Lefebvre and Alain Seksig, makes young people more aware of republican values.

Presidents 
 Bernard Lecache (1927–1968)
 Jean Pierre-Bloch (1968–1992)
 Jean-Pierre Pierre-Bloch, son of Jean Pierre-Bloch
 Pierre Aidenbaum (1992–1999)
 Patrick Gaubert (1999–2010)
 Alain Jakubowicz (2010–2017)
 Mario Stasi (since 2017)

Objectives and resources
The LICRA's aim is to stay in permanent alertness concerning any kind of discrimination. It fights against everyday racism and the banalization of xenophobic acts. It helps the victims who are most of the time not aware of their rights. It pays attention to any racist speech in the media. It does not want in any case to alter the press's freedom of speech, but only to find and correct any hate or discrimination incitement. It also makes sure that any negationist document is removed from sale.

The LICRA acts on the field thanks to its volunteers in every region. The actions programme is voted by nine commissions (historical memory, juridical, education, cultural, sport, Europe, integration, citizenship, youth). Since 1932, the LICRA publishes a newspaper: "le droit de vivre" (the right to live), which is an essential aid to express LICRA's values and engagements. Given out to all the members, it is a great tool of internal and external communication. It allows to sum up LICRA's local, national and international actions. Depending on the actuality, many personalities (political, NGO, sport...) express themselves in its columns.

Financing
The LICRA is mainly financed by state subsidies. It receives around 500,000 euros every year from the French government.

External links
 LICRA—Ligue Internationale Contre le Racisme et l'Antisémitisme—official page 
 FARE network website (Football Against Racism in Europe)

Opposition to antisemitism in Europe
Anti-racism in France
Anti-racist organizations in Europe
Organizations established in 1926
Human rights organizations based in France